The term Eastern Hungarians (or "Eastern Magyars") is used in scholarship to refer to peoples related to the Proto-Hungarians, that is, theoretically parts of the ancient community that remained in the vicinity of the Ural Mountains (at the European–Asian border) during the Migration Period and as such did not participate in the Hungarian conquest of the Carpathian Basin.

The possible locations of the remnants of Hungarians

Yugra
Yugra has been believed by some to have been the Hungarian Urheimat (homeland), which is today inhabited by the Mansi and Khanty, two related ethnic groups.

Magna Hungaria

The term "Eastern Hungarians" is also used in relation to the Magna Hungaria of Friar Julian ( 1235), located at Bashkortostan (the land of the Bashkirs), where Julian was able to communicate with the locals in his Hungarian language.

Savard Hungarians
According to Hungarian scholarship, there was a group of "Savard Hungarians" that broke off and moved across the Caucasus into Persian territory in the 8th century.

Theory of Kummagyaria

There is also the theory of "Kummagyaria", in which a group that stayed behind possessed a country north of Caucasus. According to László Bendefy, the approximate location of Kummagyaria is the riparian area of the Kuma River, Southern Russia. Odorico Raynaldi (1595–1671) mentioned Papal relations with Jeretany, called the ruler of Hungarians, Malkaites and Alans, in the 1320s. Earlier, Polish diplomat Andrzej Taranowski (1569) had mentioned the latter information. In 1712, the French traveller Aubrey de la Motraye passed through the area. His notes state that from what he heard from the local Tatar population, he maintained that the city of Mazsar was formerly inhabited by Magyars.

See also
Hungarian prehistory
Hungarian people

References

Sources

History of the Hungarians
Hungarian prehistory